The 3rd Screen Actors Guild Awards, honoring the best achievements in film and television performances for the year 1996, took place on February 22, 1997. The ceremony was held at the Shrine Exposition Center in Los Angeles, California, and was televised live by NBC. The nominees were announced on January 23, 1997.

Winners and nominees
Winners are listed first and highlighted in boldface.

Screen Actors Guild Life Achievement Award
 Angela Lansbury

Film

Television

In Memoriam
It was presented a memorial to the SAG's members who died during last year:

 Dorothy Lamour
 Whit Bissell
 Ben Johnson
 Jack Weston
 Dana Hill
 Ray Combs
 Bibi Besch
 Brigitte Helm
 Jeremy Sinden
 Natividad Vacío
 Jon Pertwee
 Marcello Mastroianni
 Virginia Christine
 Vince Edwards
 Vito Scotti
 Joanne Dru
 Claudette Colbert
 Greer Garson
 Robert Ridgely
 Greg Morris
 Morey Amsterdam
 Joe Seneca
 Lew Ayres
 Michael Fox
 Gene Nelson
 Sheldon Leonard
 Larry Gates
 Jason Bernard
 Gene Kelly
 George Burns

References

External links
 The 3rd Annual Screen Actors Guild Awards

1996
1996 film awards
1996 television awards
Screen
Screen Actors Guild
Screen
February 1997 events in the United States